Western North Carolina (often abbreviated as WNC) is the region of North Carolina which includes the Appalachian Mountains; it is often known geographically as the state's Mountain Region. The population of the region, as measured by the 2010 U.S. Census, is 1,473,241, which is approximately 15% of North Carolina's total population.

Located east of the Tennessee state line and west of the Piedmont, Western North Carolina contains few major urban centers. Asheville, located in the region's center, is the area's largest city and most prominent commercial hub. The Foothills region of the state is loosely defined as the area along Western North Carolina's eastern boundary; this region consists of a transitional terrain of hills between the Appalachians and Piedmont Plateau of central North Carolina.

Areas in the northwest portion of the Western North Carolina region, including Boone and Blowing Rock, commonly use the nickname "The High Country". The term Land of the Sky (or Land-of-Sky) is a common nickname for the Asheville area. The term is derived from the title of the novel, Land of the Sky (1876), written by Mrs. Frances Tiernan, under the pseudonym Christian Reid. She often refers in this book to the Great Smoky Mountains and Blue Ridge Mountains, the two main ranges in Western North Carolina. The Asheville area regional government body, the Land-of-Sky Regional Council, uses this nickname.

The federally recognized Eastern Band of Cherokee Indians (EBCI) have a reservation in this region known as Qualla Boundary; it is situated adjacent to the Great Smoky Mountains National Park. Their capital is at Cherokee, North Carolina. This region, taking in today's southeastern Tennessee, western North and South Carolina, and northeastern Georgia, is considered the homeland of the historic Cherokee. Many of the people were forcibly removed in the late 1830s in the Trail of Tears to Indian Territory, but others remained; their descendants make up the EBCI, among the largest of recognized tribes. Sixteen earthwork mounds or their sites, built by indigenous peoples, have been listed in state archeological records in the eleven westernmost counties. Archeological and related research in the early 21st century has revealed that there may be as many as 50 such prehistoric mounds in this area, which were long central to Cherokee towns and culture.

Subregions

Far West 

The southwestern and far west part of Western North Carolina all lie within the Appalachian Mountain chain. Mt. Mitchell, the highest peak in the state, as well as eastern North America, is located here. Asheville is the major urban hub of far western North Carolina. This area also includes a few hydroelectric projects managed by the Tennessee Valley Authority, including Fontana Dam. Tourism, especially outdoor ventures such as canoeing, whitewater rafting, camping, and fishing are important for many local economies.

High Country 
The northern counties in Western North Carolina are commonly known as the state's High Country. Centered on Boone, the High Country has the area's most popular ski resorts, including Ski Beech, Appalachian Ski Mountain, and Sugar Mountain. The area also features such attractions, historical sites, and geological formations as Linville Caverns, Grandfather Mountain, and Blowing Rock. Education, skiing, tourism, and Christmas tree farming are among this area's most prominent industries, although agriculture and raising livestock also remain important. The counties that make up the High Country are: Alleghany, Ashe, Avery, Mitchell, Watauga, Wilkes, and Yancey.

Foothills 

The Foothills is a region of transitional terrain between the Piedmont Plateau and the Appalachian Mountains, extending from the lower edge of the Blue Ridge escarpment into the upper Catawba, Yadkin, Broad, Saluda, and Savannah River valleys. The eastern slopes of the Blue Ridge drop sharply to the foothills section, going from 3,500 to 4,000 feet (1,000–1,200 m) at the top to 1,000–1,500 feet at the base. The foothills region contains numerous lower peaks and isolated mountain ranges, such as the South Mountains, Brushy Mountains, and Stone Mountain State Park. The foothills are divided into many small river and creek valleys where much of the region's population lives. Although no large cities are located in the foothills, the subregion contains many smaller cities and towns.

These towns were often developed by European Americans around a single industry, such as furniture or textiles, which depended on local waterpower as their energy sources. Since the late 20th century, many of these industries and their associated jobs have moved offshore to other countries due to globalization, although they still remain prevalent in some foothill areas. The towns that depended upon them economically, often suffered from job and population losses of people moving to areas of more economic opportunity. Some areas of the foothills are developing newer economies, including manufacturing, food distribution, utilities, and health care. Many farmers in the northern foothills are poultry farmers. Vineyards have been developed, along with associated winemaking and popular retail.

Among the towns of the foothills region are: Elkin, Forest City, Glen Alpine, Granite Falls, Hudson, Lake Lure, Rutherfordton, Spindale, Tryon, and Valdese; and the cities of  Hickory, Lenoir, Marion, Mount Airy, Shelby, and Morganton. "The southern mountains" refer to the counties bordering South Carolina. The cities/towns of Hendersonville, Brevard, and Columbus are within this area.

Higher education 

The region has three major public universities: Appalachian State University in Boone, Western Carolina University in Cullowhee, and UNC Asheville in Asheville. All three are part of the University of North Carolina system.

Several small, private colleges and universities are also located in the region. Founded in 1856, it is the oldest college or university in Western North Carolina. Lees-McRae College, located in Banner Elk, is also affiliated with the Presbyterian Church. Warren Wilson College, located in Swannanoa, is noted for its strong pro-environment policies and for being one of the nine work colleges in the United States. Brevard College, located in Brevard, is affiliated with the United Methodist Church. Lenoir-Rhyne University, located in Hickory, is a private liberal arts university affiliated with the Evangelical Lutheran Church in America.

Several community college systems serve the region, including Asheville-Buncombe Technical Community College, Blue Ridge Community College, Caldwell Community College & Technical Institute, Catawba Valley Community College, Haywood Community College, Isothermal Community College, Mayland Community College,  McDowell Technical Community College, Southwestern Community College, Tri-County Community College, Western Piedmont Community College, and Wilkes Community College.

Transportation

Highways

Interstates
Three major Interstate highways cross the region: Interstate 40, which traverses east–west, Interstate 77, which runs north–south through the northeastern section of Western North Carolina, and Interstate 26, which traverses north–south (although it is classified as an east–west highway for most of its route and is signed as such). Interstate 240 is the only auxiliary interstate route in the region, and it serves downtown Asheville.

U.S. Highways
US 421, a multi-lane expressway, is the major highway in the northwestern part of the state. US 19, US 23, US 64, US 74, and US 441 are the major highways in the far western part of the region. US 70 runs east through the area, connecting Hickory and Asheville. US 221 also runs through the area. This highway, which begins in Perry, Florida, connects the town of Rutherfordton to Jefferson. US 321 runs north from Hickory to Watauga and Avery counties before entering Tennessee.

Blue Ridge Parkway

The Blue Ridge Parkway, a National Scenic Byway that is 469 miles long, runs through western North Carolina, starting in Virginia and ending near the Great Smoky Mountains National Park.

Railroads
Two major class 1 railroads serve the region, CSX and Norfolk Southern. In addition, two tourist railroads also operate in the area, the Tweetsie Railroad theme park and the Great Smoky Mountains Railroad.

Airports
Asheville Regional Airport (AVL), located southeast of the city of Asheville in Fletcher, serves the area with non-stop jet service to Charlotte, North Carolina; LaGuardia Airport in New York City and nearby Newark, New Jersey; Houston, Texas; Atlanta, Georgia; Orlando Sanford International Airport near Orlando, Florida; Philadelphia, Pennsylvania; Detroit, Michigan; and O'Hare International Airport in Chicago, Illinois.

Economy
Tourism is a major part of the economy in the area, which contains half of the Great Smoky Mountains National Park as well as the Nantahala and Pisgah national forests. Several lakes and dams are scattered throughout Western North Carolina, such as Lake Lure and Fontana Dam. Many visitors travel to the region every summer and autumn from major cities to escape hot weather elsewhere and see the leaves change colors. The timber industry is also a major economic sector.

Appalachian Regional Commission

The Appalachian Regional Commission was formed in 1965 to aid economic development in the Appalachian region, which was lagging far behind the rest of the nation on most economic indicators. The Appalachian region, as currently defined by the commission, includes 420 counties in 13 states, including 29 counties in North Carolina. The Commission classifies each county according to five economic qualifications— distressed, at-risk, transitional, competitive, or attainment. "Distressed" counties are considered the most economically endangered and "attainment" counties are the most economically prosperous. The three indicators used for such classification are three-year average unemployment rate, market income per capita, and poverty rate.

In 2003, Appalachian North Carolina— which included most counties of Western North Carolina and two counties in central North Carolina— had a three-year average unemployment rate of 6%, compared with 6.2% statewide and 5.5% nationwide. In 2002, Appalachian North Carolina had a per capita market income of $21,168, compared with $23,443 statewide and $26,420 nationwide. In 2000, Appalachian North Carolina had a poverty rate of 11.7%, compared to 12.3% statewide and 12.4% nationwide.

Only Graham County was designated as "Distressed" in North Carolina. Six— Cherokee, McDowell, Mitchell, Rutherford, Swain, and Yancey— were designated "at-risk." Forsyth County (which is usually grouped as part of central North Carolina) was the only county given the "attainment" designation. Four— Buncombe, Davie, Henderson, and Polk— were designated "competitive." Most Western North Carolina counties were designated "transitional," meaning they lagged behind the national average on one of the three key indicators. Graham County had Appalachian North Carolina's highest poverty rating, with 19.5% of its residents living below the poverty line. Forsyth had Appalachian North Carolina's highest per capita income at $26,987. Watauga County's unemployment rate of 2.3% was lowest of all 420 counties in the Appalachian region.

The changes brought by increased tourism and population growth from retirees and persons migrating to the region have been double-edged. Local businesses have benefited from increased economic revenue, but increases in costs of living and loss of natural habitat to development, can degrade the quality of life for which the region has become notable.

Topography

Among the subranges of the Appalachian Mountains located in western North Carolina are the Great Smoky Mountains, Blue Ridge Mountains, South Mountains, Brushy Mountains, Sauratown Mountains, Great Balsam Mountains, Great Craggy Mountains, the Plott Balsams, and the Black Mountains. Valley and foothills locations typically range from  AMSL.

The major rivers in the region include the French Broad River, Nolichucky River, Watauga River, Little Tennessee River, and Hiwassee River flowing into the Tennessee River valley; the New River flowing into the Ohio River valley; and the headwaters and upper valleys of the Catawba River, Yadkin River, Broad River, and Saluda River flowing through the foothills towards the Atlantic. The Eastern Continental Divide runs through the region, dividing Tennessee-bound streams from those flowing through the Carolinas.

Area

Counties

Western North Carolina is generally considered to consist of 23 counties.

The counties commonly included in the region are as follows:

 Alleghany County
 Ashe County
 Avery County
 Buncombe County
 Burke County
 Caldwell County
 Cherokee County
 Clay County
 Graham County
 Haywood County
 Henderson County
 Jackson County
 Macon County
 Madison County
 McDowell County
 Mitchell County
 Polk County
 Rutherford County
 Swain County
 Transylvania County
 Watauga County
 Wilkes County
 Yancey County

Other counties that fall under various definitions of Western North Carolina include: Alexander County, Catawba County, Cleveland County, Surry County and Yadkin County. This makes the region roughly the size of Massachusetts.

During the early 1800s the western counties in North Carolina included counties located in the piedmont region, to distinguish them from the eastern counties in North Carolina that were settled earlier. As the western counties became more populated, jurisdictions competed for representation in the North Carolina General Assembly and the Governor's office.

Cities and towns

Listed below are communities often considered to be a part of Western North Carolina:

Over 40,000 inhabitants
 Asheville
 Hickory (Located in the North Carolina foothills; contains small amounts of territory in Burke and Caldwell Counties)

Over 10,000 inhabitants
 Boone
 Hendersonville
 Lenoir
 Morganton
 Waynesville

Fewer than 10,000 inhabitants

 Andrews
 Bakersville
 Banner Elk
 Beech Mountain
 Biltmore Forest
 Black Mountain
 Blowing Rock
 Bostic
 Brevard
 Bryson City
 Burnsville
 Cajah's Mountain
 Canton
 Cedar Rock
 Chimney Rock
 Clyde
 Columbus
 Connellys Springs
 Crossnore
 Dillsboro
 Drexel
 Elk Park
 Elkin
 Ellenboro
 Flat Rock
 Fletcher
 Fontana Dam
 Forest City
 Forest Hills
 Franklin
 Gamewell
 Glen Alpine
 Grandfather
 Granite Falls
 Hayesville
 Highlands
 Hildebran
 Hot Springs
 Hudson
 Jefferson
 Lake Lure
 Lake Santeetlah
 Lansing
 Laurel Park
 Long View
 Maggie Valley
 Marion
 Mars Hill
 Marshall
 Mills River
 Montreat
 Murphy
 Newland
 North Wilkesboro
 Old Fort
 Rhodhiss
 Robbinsville
 Ronda
 Rosman
 Ruth
 Rutherford College
 Rutherfordton
 Saluda
 Sawmills
 Seven Devils
 Sparta
 Spindale
 Spruce Pine
 Sugar Mountain
 Sylva
 Tryon
 Valdese
 Weaverville
 Webster
 West Jefferson
 Wilkesboro
 Woodfin

Important unincorporated communities
 Brasstown (site of John C. Campbell Folk School)
 Cashiers (a popular tourist area)
 Cherokee (headquarters for the Eastern Band of the Cherokee)
 Collettsville (located near Wilson Creek)
 Cullowhee (site of Western Carolina University's main campus)
 Deals Gap (site of a nationally famous motorcycle and sportscar resort)
 Lake Junaluska (headquarters for the World Methodist Council and site of a United Methodist camp and conference center)
 Linville (a popular recreation area)
 Little Switzerland (located near Blue Ridge Parkway)

See also
 828 area code
 Appalachia
 East Tennessee
 Geography of North Carolina
 North Carolina's 11th congressional district
 Piedmont Triad

References

External links
 

 
Geography of Appalachia
Regions of North Carolina
State of Franklin